"Free Me" is a song by the English singer Emma Bunton from her second solo studio album of the same name (2003). The song was written by Bunton, Hélène Muddiman and Mike Peden, and produced by the latter. It was released on 26 May 2003 as the album's lead single. It debuted and peaked at number five on the UK Singles Chart, becoming Bunton's fourth UK top-five single. The single also peaked at number four on the US Hot Dance Club Play chart. An accompanying music video was directed by Tim Royes and filmed in Rio de Janeiro, Brazil, including locations such as Macumba Beach, Guanabara Bay and the Alto da Boa Vista neighbourhood.

Background
In 2001, Bunton released her first solo album, A Girl Like Me, through Virgin Records. It spent over 12 weeks in the UK Albums Chart, peaking at number four and earning a gold certification from the British Phonographic Industry (BPI). It also produced her only solo chart-topper "What Took You So Long?", as well as the top-five singles "What I Am" and "Take My Breath Away", and the top-20 entry "We're Not Gonna Sleep Tonight". She then left Virgin, and signed a new deal with 19 Recordings, run by the former Spice Girls' manager Simon Fuller. Bunton said, "We've always been in contact with Simon (Fuller): we've always texted each other and he was very supportive of my last album. And when I went through all these changes as I mentioned earlier I wanted people around me who were confident in me and wanted to support me and give me that extra push. I wanted people who believed in what I did and I knew, the whole time, that Simon believed in me. It felt really natural and I knew he was the best manager around and he'd allow me to be opinionated. For me, I know exactly what I want and people get scared of that. They want to push you in the direction they want you to go in and that's not right for me. I like to think I know what my fans like and what I feel comfortable doing."

Track listings
UK CD 1
"Free Me" – 4:28
"Who the Hell Are You" – 3:20
"Free Me"  – 7:08
"Free Me" 

UK CD 2
"Free Me" – 4:28
"Tomorrow" – 3:56
"Free Me"  – 6:18

Credits and personnel
Credits adapted from the liner notes of Free Me.

 Emma Bunton – vocals, songwriting
 Richard Dowling – mastering
 Martin Hayles – keyboards, recording
 Graham Kearns – guitar
 Nick Ingman – orchestra arrangement, orchestra conducting
 Isobel Griffiths Ltd – orchestra contractor
 Hélène Muddiman – backing vocals, keyboards, songwriting
 Mike Peden – bass guitar, production, songwriting
 Charlie Russell – live drums, programming
 Mark 'Spike' Stent – mixing
 Gavyn Wright – orchestra leader

Charts

Weekly charts

Year-end charts

Release history

References

19 Recordings singles
2003 singles
2003 songs
Emma Bunton songs
Music videos directed by Tim Royes
Songs written by Emma Bunton
Songs written by Mike Peden
Universal Records singles